Network Policy and Access Services (NPAS) is a component of Windows Server 2008. It replaces the Internet Authentication Service (IAS) from Windows Server 2003. NPAS helps you safeguard the health and security of a network. The NPAS server role includes Network Policy Server (NPS), Health Registration Authority (HRA), and Host Credential Authorization Protocol (HCAP). In Windows Server 2003, IAS is the Microsoft implementation of a Remote Authentication Dial-In User Service (RADIUS) server. In Windows Server operating systems later than Windows Server 2003, IAS is renamed to NPS.

Overview 
NPS is a role service in Windows Server 2008 which can function as:
 RADIUS server
 RADIUS proxy
 Network Access Protection policy server

Features 
NPSEE enables the use of a heterogeneous set of wireless, switch, remote access, or VPN equipment. One can use NPS with the Routing and Remote Access service, which is available in Microsoft Windows 2000, Windows Server 2003, Standard Edition; Windows Server 2003, Enterprise Edition; and Windows Server 2003, Datacenter Edition.

When a server running NPS is a member of an Active Directory Domain Services (AD DS) domain, NPS uses the directory service as its user account database and is part of a single sign-on solution. The same set of credentials is used for network access control (authenticating and authorizing access to a network) and to log on to an AD DS domain.

References

External links
 NPS on Microsoft TechNet

Windows Server 2008